WAST-LP (analog channel 25) was a low-power television station in Ashland, Wisconsin, United States. The station was a semi-satellite of the UPN-affiliated second digital subchannel of KBJR-TV in Duluth, Minnesota, then-called Northland UPN and Northland 9, but was owned by a separate entity, Martinsen Investments, which also owns a large percentage of the property in Ashland. WAST-LP sold local advertising specifically for the Ashland area, preempting KBJR-DT2's advertising breaks.

WAST-LP once carried its own local newscasts, concentrating on Ashland and northern Wisconsin events, but they were canceled after the LMA to simulcast KBJR-DT2 went into effect, accompanied by the staff reduced to a skeleton crew to keep the station in operation with the KBJR-DT2 rebroadcast.

On August 1, 2006, the station ended operations and went off the air, a month short of KBJR-DT2's conversion to MyNetworkTV. Despite being off the air for eight years, long after most stations licenses are canceled for not broadcasting, WAST-LP's license remained active until January 3, 2014, when its previous license to broadcast was fully exhausted.

References

External links 
Business North: "Mavericks plan to relaunch Ashland TV station" (from March 2005)

Defunct television stations in the United States
Television channels and stations established in 1995
Television channels and stations disestablished in 2006
1995 establishments in Wisconsin
2006 disestablishments in Wisconsin
Ashland, Wisconsin
AST-LP